{{Infobox venue
| name                = City of Hoquiam - Olympic Stadium
| nickname            = 
| image               = 
| fullname            = 
| location            = 101 28th StreetHoquiam, Washington 98550-2901
| coordinates         = 
| broke_ground        = 
| built               = 
| opened              = 1937
| renovated           = 2006
| expanded            = 
| closed              = 
| demolished          = 
| owner               = City of Hoquiam
| operator            = 
| surface             = Grass
| construction_cost   = 
| architect           = Works Progress Administration
| structural engineer = 
| services engineer   = 
| general_contractor  = 
| project_manager     = 
| main_contractors    = Works Progress Administration
| former_names        = 
| tenants             = Baseball (Professional)Grays Harbor Ports (1976)Grays Harbor Loggers (1977 - 1978; 1980 - 1981)Grays Harbor Mets (1979)Grays Harbor Gulls (1995 - 1997)Grays Harbor Rain (1999)Football (High School)Hoquiam High School Grizzlies''Grays Harbor Bearcats semi-professional football Bearcats
| capacity            = 9,000
| record_attendance   = 
| dimensions          =
}}Olympic Stadium''' is a stadium in Hoquiam, Washington which opened in 1938. The City of Hoquiam first got the idea for an all-wood stadium in the early 1930s when it applied for a Civil Works Administration grant. In 1932, the grant was approved. Construction began in early 1938 with the stadium officially opening to the public on Nov. 24, 1938. A renovation grant was awarded through the "Save America's Treasures" program requested by Congressional Representative Norm Dicks in 2005. Dicks also backed the State Historic Preservation Office request to add the stadium to the National Register of Historic Places which was granted in 2006.

The physical structure of Olympic Stadium is an old-growth fir heavy-timber frame with cedar shingles siding. Built in a truncated U-shape with angled corners, the open portion of the 2½ story grandstand faces east. This orientation was used so that fans and players would be somewhat sheltered from the wind and rain coming off the Pacific Ocean.

The all wooden park appears to be one of the more unusual in the country, with the shingled exterior, the completely covered 'L' shaped grandstand extending all the way down the line in right and extending into the outfield. The seats are wooden grandstands, which overlook the fields which are in excellent shape.

In 2015 the Grays Harbor Gulls of the newly minted Mount Rainier Professional Baseball League opened for business. Prior to that the stadium last hosted professional baseball in the late 1990s when the Grays Harbor Gulls of the independent Western Baseball League called this park home and is now the home of the Grays Harbor Bearcats, a semi-pro football team. With an overflow capacity of 10,000, the stadium hosts baseball and football fields and receives plenty of use from teams such as the Bearcats football team, Hoquiam High School football team, Hoquiam Youth Baseball and Youth Football, the Comcast Outdoor Cinema, the Push Rods event, the Bluegrass festival and Logger's Playday events yearly.

References

Sports venues in Washington (state)
Minor league baseball venues
Event venues on the National Register of Historic Places in Washington (state)
National Register of Historic Places in Grays Harbor County, Washington
Sports venues on the National Register of Historic Places
Cultural infrastructure completed in 1937
Civil Works Administration
1937 establishments in Washington (state)
New Deal in Washington (state)